Hilton Head Airport  is on Hilton Head Island, in Beaufort County, South Carolina, United States. Also known as Hilton Head Island Airport, it is owned by Beaufort County.

In the spring of 2019, United Airlines began seasonal service to its hubs at Chicago-O’Hare, Newark, and Washington-Dulles, and American Airlines added seasonal service to its Washington-National hub to its existing service to Charlotte. Growth continued in May 2019, when Delta Air Lines resumed year round service to its hub in Atlanta, as well as adding a new seasonal route to New York-LaGuardia. All of these flights are operated by regional affiliates. One public charter airline operates limited service. It is the only airport on Hilton Head Island.

The National Plan of Integrated Airport Systems for 2017–2021 categorized it as a primary commercial service airport. USDOT records say the airport had 56,330 passengers in calendar year 2017.

Many U.S. airports use the same three-letter location identifier for the FAA and IATA, but this airport is HXD to the FAA and HHH to the IATA. The IATA code HHH is used for airline booking.

History
Hilton Head Island has been known for championship golf courses for decades. In the 1960s it was decided that an airport would allow an increase in the number of visitors to the island. Hilton Head Island Airport opened in 1967 after Arnold Palmer told Charles E. Fraser that he would play golf on Hilton Head if there was an airport for him to land. On July 5, 2018, Piedmont Airlines’ Bombardier Dash 8 service was ceased, and Republic Airways began serving Hilton Head Airport with the E175. This marks the first commercially scheduled jet service to the airport.

In the past the airport was served by the following:

 1980 - 1984: Eastern Airlines (Atlantis Airways) with service to Atlanta and Charlotte, operated with a Dash 6
 1991 - 1994: American Eagle Airlines with service to Raleigh-Durham, operated with an ATR 42/72 and a Saab 340
 April 23, 1995 - May 3, 1997 Midway Connection (Great Lakes Airlines) to Raleigh-Durham, operated with a Beech 1900
 March 1, 1998 - ?: Continental Connection (Colgan Air) with service to Atlanta, operated with a Beech 1900
 March 12, 2000 - August 6, 2015 US Airways Express with service to Charlotte and Washington, D.C., operated with a Bombardier Dash 8
 March 17, 2007 - November 30, 2008: Delta Connection (Atlantic Southeast Airlines) with service to Atlanta, operated with an ATR 72
 March 4, 2010 - November 1, 2010: Delta Connection (Mesaba Airlines) with service to Atlanta, operated with a Saab 340

Facilities
Hilton Head Island Airport covers 180 acres (53 ha) at an elevation of 19 feet (6 m). Its one runway, 3/21, is 5,000 by 100 feet (1,524 x 30 m). The runway was extended from 4,300 feet to 5,000 feet in the summer of 2018. The FAA had recommended the runway be extended to 5,300 feet but public opinion on Hilton Head Island necessitated a smaller extension. In October 2010, the airport adopted a master plan that called for a 5,400 feet extension. However, that did not come to fruition. 

Other safety improvements to the airport have been completed since 2018, including the relocation of Taxiway A by 100 feet, added airfield drainage components, removal of trees in the flight path and the revision of the general aviation parking area.

The current terminal building was built in 1995. At , it has four airline gates.

For the 12-month period ending July 31, 2018, the airport had 37,632 aircraft operations, an average of 103 per day: 81% general aviation, 17% air taxi and 2% military. In July 2018, there were 89 aircraft based at this airport: 62% single-engine, 26% multi-engine, 9% jet, 2% helicopter and 1% ultralight.

Airlines and destinations

Passenger

Statistics

In 2018, HXD handled 75,620 total commercial passengers. The only commercial route to and from HXD at that time was to Charlotte, North Carolina.

Top destinations

Annual traffic

References

External links

 Hilton Head Island Airport at Beaufort County website
 Hilton Head (HXD) at South Carolina Aeronautics Commission website
 Signature Flight Support, the fixed-base operator
 Map of the airport from OpenStreetMap
 
 

Airports in South Carolina
Transportation in Beaufort County, South Carolina
Buildings and structures in Beaufort County, South Carolina
1967 establishments in South Carolina
Airports established in 1967